Susan Penhaligon (born 3 July 1949) is a British actress and writer known for her role in the drama series Bouquet of Barbed Wire (1976), and for playing Helen Barker in the sitcom A Fine Romance (1981–1984). 

She appeared in the soap opera Emmerdale as Jean Hope in 2006, and her film appearances include Under Milk Wood (1972); No Sex Please, We're British (1973); The Land That Time Forgot (1974);  The Uncanny (1977); Paul Verhoeven's Soldier of Orange (1977) and as Lucy Westenra in Count Dracula (1977). She has also had a substantial stage career.

Tagged the "British Bardot" in the 1970s, she was described by Clive Aslet in The Daily Telegraph as "the face of the decade".

Early life and education
Penhaligon was the eldest child of Bill, an engineer for the Shell Oil Company, and Jean Penhaligon who ran a bed and breakfast. Born in Manila where her father was working, Penhaligon returned with her family to the UK aged six and spent her formative years living in St Ives and Falmouth in Cornwall. Aged 11 she was sent to boarding school in Bristol where her acting ambitions were encouraged. She has two brothers and a sister in the USA. After her parents divorced, her father went to live in San Francisco. She is a cousin of the late David Penhaligon, a former Liberal member of parliament in Cornwall.

While training at the Webber Douglas Academy of Dramatic Art, Penhaligon shared a flat with Peter Hammill; she is mentioned in the lyrics of the Van der Graaf Generator song "Refugees" and the Hammill song "Easy to Slip Away".

Acting career

Theatre
Penhaligon's first appearance in the theatre was playing Juliet in Romeo and Juliet at the Connaught Theatre, Worthing in a two weekly repertory company.

In the West End she appeared in a 1987 production of Three Sisters at the Albery Theatre. In 1982, she played a leading part in The Real Thing at the Strand Theatre, Aldwych (now called the Novello). She appeared in The Maintenance Man at the Comedy Theatre in 1987, and played Curley’s Wife in a 1984 production of Of Mice and Men at the Mermaid Theatre. She has toured the UK extensively, appearing in productions of The Constant Wife (Richmond Theatre, 2004), Mrs. Warren's Profession (Richmond Theatre, 2009), Death Trap (Theatre Royal, Norwich, 2002), Agatha Christie's Verdict (Floral Pavilion Theatre, 2011), Dangerous Obsession with Simon Ward (Theatre Royal, Bath, 1989), and Lord Arthur Saville's Crime by Oscar Wilde (Richmond Theatre, 2005).

She was in Time and the Conways, Lower Depths and The Cherry Orchard, and played a leading part in Arthur Miller's Broken Glass at the West Yorkshire Playhouse in Leeds.

In the Edinburgh Festival Fringe she appeared in the premiere of Dario Fo's Abduction Diana and she appeared in a critically acclaimed production of Misery at the King's Head Theatre and Keeping Up With the Joans with her friend Katy Manning.

Television
Her television credits include Public Eye (1975, as Tuesday Simpson, a lesbian, would-be seductress of Julian Bradley, played by Ronald Lewis), Count Dracula (1977) with Louis Jourdan, Bouquet of Barbed Wire, Upstairs Downstairs, Tales of the Unexpected, Bergerac, Remington Steele, Wycliffe, Doctor Who, The Taming of the Shrew by the BBC Shakespeare series, Heart of the Country and A Kind of Loving. In A Fine Romance, she played Helen Barker. She has been in three episodes of Doctors and three episodes of Casualty. She also played Jean Hope in UK soap Emmerdale, for a year.

Film
Penhaligon had roles in films such as Say Hello to Yesterday (1970); Private Road (1971); Under Milk Wood (1972) as Mae Rose Cottage; No Sex Please, We're British (1973); The Land That Time Forgot (1974); House of Mortal Sin (1976); Nasty Habits (1977); Paul Verhoeven's Soldier of Orange (1977) as a British military officer; The Uncanny (1977); Leopard in the Snow (1978); Patrick (1978); The Masks of Death (1984) and Top Dog (2014). She also played the role of the sole survivor of LANSA Flight 508, Juliane Koepcke in the film Miracles Still Happen (1974), directed by Giuseppe Maria Scotese.

Writing career
Her novel For the Love of Angel, published in 2008 by Truran Books, is set in Cornwall in the 1880s.

Filmography

Film

Television

References

External links
 
Aveleyman: Susan Penhaligon

1949 births
Living people
Alumni of the Webber Douglas Academy of Dramatic Art
British film actresses
British soap opera actresses
British stage actresses
British television actresses
British people of Cornish descent
People from St Ives, Cornwall